Skedaddle Gold is a 1927 American silent Western film directed by Richard Thorpe and starring Hal Taliaferro, Betty Baker and Bob Burns.

Cast
 Hal Taliaferro as Kent Blake 
 Betty Baker as Wanda Preston 
 Bob Burns as Sheriff 
 George F. Marion as George F. 
 Harry Todd as Rusty 
 Gordon Standing as John Martin

References

Bibliography
 Langman, Larry. A Guide to Silent Westerns. Greenwood Publishing Group, 1992.

External links
 

1927 films
1927 Western (genre) films
1920s English-language films
American black-and-white films
Pathé Exchange films
Films directed by Richard Thorpe
Silent American Western (genre) films
American silent feature films
1920s American films